Egypt, as the United Arab Republic, competed at the 1968 Summer Olympics in Mexico City, Mexico. 30 competitors, all men, took part in 18 events in 7 sports.

Boxing

Diving

Fencing

Four fencers, all men, represented Egypt in 1968.

Men's foil
 Ahmed El-Hamy El-Husseini
 Mohamed Gamil El-Kalyoubi
 Moustafa Soheim

Men's team foil
 Ahmed El-Hamy El-Husseini, Mohamed Gamil El-Kalyoubi, Moustafa Soheim, Ahmed Zein El-Abidin

Men's épée
 Ahmed Zein El-Abidin

Shooting

Two shooters represented Egypt in 1968.

Trap
 Mohamed Mehrez
 Badir Shoukri

Water polo

Men's Team Competition
Preliminary Round (Group B)
 Lost to Yugoslavia (2:13)
 Lost to Italy (1:10)
 Lost to Greece (6:7)
 Lost to Japan (4:7)
 Lost to Netherlands (3:6)
 Lost to East Germany (2:19)
 Tied with Mexico (3:3)
Classification Matches
13th/15th place: Lost to Brazil (3:5) → Fifteenth place
Team Roster
Adel El-Moalem
Alaa El-Shafei
Ashraf Gamil
Galal Touny
Haroun Touny
Hossam El-Baroudi
Khaled El-Kashef
Mohamed El-Bassiouni
Sameh Soliman
Salah Shalaby
Sameh Soliman

Weightlifting

Wrestling

References

External links
Official Olympic Reports

Nations at the 1968 Summer Olympics
1968
1968 in Egyptian sport